The Bagratid dynasties or the Bagratids (Bagrat + Classic Greek: - id, the children) may refer to:
Bagratid dynasty of Armenia, or Bagratuni
Bagratid dynasty of Georgia, or Bagrationi

See also
 Origin of the Bagratid dynasties